Battle of South Henan  (late Jan. – early Feb. 1941)

Japan 

11th Army – Waichirō Sonobe
 3rd Division – Fusataro Hanjima [1]?
 5th Infantry Brigade
 6th Infantry Regiment
 68th Infantry Regiment
 29th Infantry Brigade
 18th Infantry Regiment
 34th Infantry Regiment
 3rd Field Artillery Regiment
 3rd Cavalry Regiment
 3rd Engineer Regiment
 3rd Transport Regiment
 39th Division – Lt. Gen Keisaku Muragami [4,5]
 39th Infantry Brigade Group
 231st Infantry Rregiments
 232nd Infantry Regiments
 233rd Infantry Regiments
 39th Recon Regiment
 39th Field Artillery Regiment
 39th Military Engineer Regiment
 39th Transport Regiment
 4th Division (partial) – Lt. Gen Kenzo Kitano [4,5]
 4th Infantry Brigade group:
 8th Infantry Regiment
 37th Infantry Regiment 
 61st Infantry Regiment 
 4th Recon Regiment 
 4th Field Artillery Regiment 
 4th Military Engineer Regiment
 4th Transport Regiment 
 40th Division –  Lt-General Naojikiro Amaya, Manchuria 10/2/39-8/25/1941[4,5]
 40th Infantry Brigade group: 
 234th Infantry regiment
 235th Infantry regiment 
 236th Infantry regiment
 40th Cavalry regiment
 40th mountain artillery regiment
 40th military engineer regiment
 40th Transport  regiment
 Kurahashi Detachment/15th Division – Col. Kurahashi 
 60th Infantry Regiment (from 15th Division in the Nanchang area)
 17th Division – Lt-General Morito Hirabayashi[4,5]  
 17th Infantry Brigade Group 
 53rd Infantry Regiment 
 54th Infantry Regiment 
 81st Infantry Regiment 
 23rd Field Artillery Regiment
 7th Military Engineer Regiment
 17th Transport Regiment
 18th Independent Mixed Brigade – Lt. Gen Taka Kayashima 1939- 1941[4,5]
 92nd Independent infantry battalion
 93rd Independent infantry battalion
 94th Independent infantry battalion
 95th Independent infantry battalion
 96th independent infantry battalion
 artillery troops
 labor troops 
 signal communication unit.
 7th Tank Regiment – ?
 13th Tank Regiment – ?
 ?  Tank Regiment – ? [1] (one of 3 Tank Regiments)
 1 Separate Heavy Artillery Regiment

Airforce: 
 ? (100 aircraft)

China 

5th War Area – Li Tsung-jen [1]
 2nd Army Group – Sun Lianzhong
 55th Corps -Tsao Fu-lin 
 74th Division – Tsao Fu-lin
 29th Division – Li Tseng-chih
 59th Corps – Huang Wei-kang
 38th Division – Li Chiu-sze
 180th Division – Liu Chen-shan
 68th Corps – Liu Ju-ming 
 143rd Division – Huang Chao-sung
 119th Division – Chen Hsin-chi
 36th Provincial Division – Liu Ju-chen
 33rd Army Group – Feng Zhi'an
 77th Corps – Feng Chih-an (concurrent
 37th Division – Li Chiu-sze
 179th Division – Liu Chen-shan
 30th Corps – Chih Feng-cheng
 27th Division – Hsu Wen-yao
 30th Division – Liu Chen-shan
 2nd Army – Ho Chu-kuo
 Separate Inf. Brigade
 3rd Division -
 31st Army Group – Tang Enbo
 92nd Corps – Li Hsien-chou
 21st Division – Hsu Wen-yao
 142nd Division – Fu Li-ping
 14th  Provincial Division – Liao Yun-tse
 85th Corps – Li Hsien-chou
 4th Division – Shih Chueh
 25th Division – Ni Tsu-hui
 11th  Reserve Division – Chang Tang-hsiang
 29th Corps – Chen Ta-ching
 19th Division – Lai Ju-hsiung
 91st Division – Wang Yu-wen
 16th  Provincial Division – Li Chiang
 13th Corps – Chang Hsueh-chung
 89th Division – Shu Yung
 110th Division – Wu Shao-chou 
 New 1st  Division – Tsai Chi
 84th Corps – Mo Shu-chieh
 ? 
 36th Corps – ?
 ? 
 15th Sep. Brigade – Huang Tze-hua
 14th Artillery Regiment
 4th Separate Engineer Battalion
 4th Battery, 1st Btn. 56th AT Regiment

Airforce: 
 ?

Sources 
 [1] Hsu Long-hsuen and Chang Ming-kai, History of The Sino-Japanese War (1937-1945) 2nd Ed., 1971. Translated by Wen Ha-hsiung, Chung Wu Publishing; 33, 140th Lane, Tung-hwa Street, Taipei, Taiwan Republic of China.
 [4]  Generals from Japan
 [5]  The Japanese Mutumi troop encyclopedia

Second Sino-Japanese War orders of battle